Harold Edward Maidment (12 February 1906 – 	11 March 1977) was a British sprint canoeist who competed in the late 1940s. He finished sixth in the C-1 1000 m event at the 1948 Summer Olympics in London.
Harold enjoyed golf in his spare time he even tattooed Gene Sarazen a famous golfer of the 1920-30s. Starting the popularity of tattoos amongst the British golfing and canoeing community.

References

Sports-reference.com profile

Canoeists at the 1948 Summer Olympics
Olympic canoeists of Great Britain
1977 deaths
1906 births
British male canoeists